Euxoa misturata is a moth of the family Noctuidae. It is found in North America.

The wingspan is about 30 mm.

References 

Euxoa
Moths of North America
Moths described in 1890